is a training facility, managed by the United States Marine Corps and a former World War II airfield complex on Ie Shima, an island located off the northwest coast of Okinawa Island in the East China Sea. The airfield as such was inactivated after 1946 but part of the former airfield is still used as a training facility for parachute drops and vertical take off and landing aircraft such as the F-35. The facility is referenced as FAC6005 by Okinawa Prefecture.

History

Invasion and construction

The airfields on Ie Shima were built by the Japanese prior to the American invasion and subsequent Battle of Okinawa in April 1945.   It was seized by elements of the United States Army 77th Infantry Division after intermittent bombardment of the island by the United States Navy Fifth Fleet from 25 March through 16 April when the invasion of the island commenced.  The island was not declared secure until 24 April.

Prior to the invasion, the Japanese commander on Okinawa, believing that Ie Shima could not be held for more than a few days, ordered that the airfields on the island be destroyed by the end of March 1945. Thorough demolitions followed. The runways were ditched and blasted and the entire central area sown with mines, as defense against possible airborne attack. The airfields were also mined by unused aerial bombs and mines made from drums of gasoline.

Base development proceeded rapidly once the mopping up was completed. Although initially delayed by the large number of mines, soldiers from the 805th Engineer Aviation Battalion, 1892nd Engineer Aviation Battalion, the 1902nd and the 1903rd Engineer Aviation Battalions, and several other engineering units quickly repaired the enemy airfields and began the construction of new runways, along with a series of interlinking taxiways, revetments, maintenance facilities along with a containment facility for personnel. The coral foundation of the island and the rubble of the town of Ie facilitated the work. There was ample room for dispersal area, and the sloping ground on the sides and ends of the central plateau provided space for housing base personnel. Japanese civilians were evacuated to Tokashiki in the Kerama Islands. Engineers discovered a large limestone basin on the north coast which produced 100,000 gallons of fresh water. Under these conditions work proceeded rapidly and by 10 May one fighter group was based on the island. By the middle of the month three runways were ready for operational use along with taxiways.  In addition, radar and air warning facilities installed, although much construction work remained.

Operational units assigned
By 14 June three fighter groups and one night fighter squadron were operating from the airfield. As expected, Ie Shima proved to be an ideal base for the support of operations on Okinawa and for preparing later attacks on the Japanese homeland.

 Headquarters, 43d Bombardment Group, Fifth Air Force
 B-24 Liberator, 26 July-10 November 1945
 63d Bombardment Squadron, 25 July-10 December 1945
 64th Bombardment Squadron, 26 July-10 December 1945
 65th Bombardment Squadron, 24 July-10 December 1945

 Headquarters, 90th Bombardment Group, Fifth Air Force
 B-24 Liberator, 10 August–December 1945
 319th Bombardment Squadron, 12 August-23 November 1945
 320th Bombardment Squadron, 10 August-23 November 1945
 321st Bombardment Squadron, 15 August-23 November 1945
 400th Bombardment Squadron, 11 August-23 November 1945

 Headquarters, 345th Bombardment Group, Fifth Air Force
 B-25 Mitchell, 25 July-10 December 1945
 498th Bombardment Squadron, 20 July-1 December 1945
 499th Bombardment Squadron, 20 July-1 December 1945
 500th Bombardment Squadron, 20 July-1 December 1945
 501st Bombardment Squadron, 20 July-1 December 1945

 Headquarters, 71st Reconnaissance Group, Fifth Air Force
 Various Aircraft, August-26 October 1945
 17th Reconnaissance Squadron, 29 July-26 October 1945
 82d Reconnaissance Squadron, 28 July-7 October 1945
 110th Reconnaissance Squadron, 28 July-6 October 1945

 28th Reconnaissance Squadron (Detachment) Seventh Air Force
 Various Aircraft, 23 April-8 May 1945;14 May-21 June 1945

 Headquarters, 3d Air Commando Group, Fifth Air Force
 P-51 Mustang, 9 August-27 October 1945
 3d Fighter (Commando) Squadron, 9 August-27 October 1945
 Squadron operated from Atsugi Airfield, Japan, 20 September-7 October 1945
 4th Fighter (Commando) Squadron, 9 August-27 October 1945
 Squadron operated from Atsugi Airfield, Japan, 20 September-7 October 1945
 318th Troop Carrier Squadron, 25 August-7 September 1945, C-47 Skytrain
 Squadron operated from Atsugi Airfield, Japan, 20 September-7 October 1945

 67th Troop Carrier Squadron (433d Troop Carrier Group), Fifth Air Force
 C-46 Commando, 9–25 September 1945
 68th Troop Carrier Squadron (433d Troop Carrier Group), Fifth Air Force
 C-46 Commando, 10–30 September 1945
 70th Troop Carrier Squadron (433d Troop Carrier Group), Fifth Air Force
 C-46 Commando, 15–30 September 1945

 Headquarters, 8th Fighter Group, Fifth Air Force
 P-38 Lightning, 6 August-22 November 1945
 35th Fighter Squadron, 9 August-21 November 1945
 36th Fighter Squadron, 6 August-21 November 1945
 80th Fighter Squadron, 5 August-25 November 1945

 Headquarters, 49th Fighter Group, Fifth Air Force
 P-38 Lightning, 16 August-15 September 1945
 7th Fighter Squadron, 17 August-15 September 1945
 8th Fighter Squadron, 17 August-15 September 1945
 9th Fighter Squadron, 16 August-15 September 1945

 Headquarters, 58th Fighter Group, Fifth Air Force
 P-47 Thunderbolt, 10 July-26 October 1945
 69th Fighter Squadron, 8 July-26 October 1945
 310th Fighter Squadron, 9 July-26 October 1945
 311th Fighter Squadron, 8 July-26 October 1945

 Headquarters, 318th Fighter Group, Twentieth/Eighth Air Force
 P-47 Thunderbolt, 30 April–November 1945
 19th Fighter Squadron, 30 April–November 1945
 73d Fighter Squadron, 30 April–November 1945
 333d Fighter Squadron, 30 April–November 1945

 Headquarters, 348th Fighter Group, Fifth Air Force
 P-51 Mustang, 9 July–October 1945
 340th Fighter Squadron, 9 July-9 September 1945
 341st Fighter Squadron, 12 July-9 September 1945
 460th Fighter Squadron, 25 July-24 NOv 1945

 Headquarters, 413th Fighter Group, Twentieth/Eighth Air Force
 P-47 Thunderbolt, 19 May-10 November 1945
 1st Fighter Squadron,  19 May-17 November 1945
 21st Fighter Squadron, 10 May-21 November 1945
 34th Fighter Squadron, 19 May-17 November 1945

 Headquarters, 475th Fighter Group, Fifth Air Force
 P-38 Lightning, 8 August-23 September 1945
 431st Fighter Squadron, 8 August-8 October 1945
 432d Fighter Squadron, 8 August-28 September 1945
 433d Fighter Squadron, 8 August-28 September 1945

 Headquarters, 507th Fighter Group, Twentieth/Eighth Air Force
 P-47 Thunderbolt, 29 July 1945 – 29 January 1946
 463d Fighter Squadron, 24 June 1945 – 29 January 1946
 464th Fighter Squadron, 24 June 1945 – 29 January 1946
 465th Fighter Squadron, 24 June 1945 – 29 January 1946

 421st Night Fighter Squadron (315th Composite Wing), 24 July-25 November 1945, P-61 Black Widow
 547th Night Fighter Squadron (V Fighter Command), 13 August-7 October 1945, P-61 Black Widow
 548th Night Fighter Squadron (Seventh Air Force), 8 June-1 December 1945, P-61 Black Widow
 549th Night Fighter Squadron (Seventh Air Force), 8 June-1 December 1945, P-61 Black Widow
 Headquarters, 301st Fighter Wing, 31 July-29 November 1945
 160th Liaison Squadron (308th Bombardment Wing), 15 August-22 September 1945, L-5, UC-64

Japanese Surrender Delegation
On 19 August 1945, two B-25Js of the 345th Bombardment Group and 80th Fighter Squadron P-38 Lightnings escorted two Japanese Mitsubishi G4M "Betty" bombers. The Japanese aircraft carried a delegation from Tokyo en route to Manila to meet General MacArthur's staff to work out details of the surrender.

The Betty bombers were painted white with green crosses on the wings, fuselage and vertical tail surface and use the call signs Bataan I and Bataan II. After the delegation landed at Ie Shima, they boarded a C-54 Skymaster and were flown to Manila. After the meeting, they returned to Ie Shima. One of the two Bettys crashed on its way back to Japan out of fuel, due to an incorrect conversion of liters to gallons when the bombers were refueled. The crew were helped by a local fisherman, and returned to Tokyo by train.

Postwar use
With the end of the war, many of the units assigned to Ie Shima were reassigned or inactivated. By the end of 1946, the facility was closed and placed in reserve status.

In the late 1950s the air station was used as a bomb gunnery range.

In March 1955, occurred what has been called the second Invasion of the island by the American military. After  the expropriation of their lands and houses at gun-point, many local farmers were injured when trying pick up spent cartridges left by aircraft performing gunnery practice.

There were two Air Force units stationed on the island in the early 1960s. One was Detachment 1, 1962nd Communications Group which operated a radio receiver site. The other was a unit responsible for operating the 18th Tactical Fighter Wing's bomb gunnery range on the island. Although small, the base looked much like a full-fledged base which included barracks, mess hall, fire department, security guards and guard dogs, a small motor pool and even a Non-Commissioned Officers Club. Although the air force station had a usable runway which was occasionally used, transport of personnel and supplies to the island was on the local civilian ferry from Motobu Port on Okinawa.

In 1963 the island experienced a severe drought. For a while all the water wells on the island except for one dried up. That one well was on airfield property controlled by the U.S. Air Force.  The officer in charge dispatched his fire department personnel to use the station's pumper truck to pick up water at the well and to distribute the water to several locations on the island.  As a result, Air Force officials on Ie Shima and Okinawa received several letters of appreciation from local officials.

Current use
The American military still controlled roughly one third of the island in 2010. As of May 2019, according to the "Ie Island Guide Map" posted at the ferry landing, the American Military controls roughly 15% of the island as the "Ie Shima Training Facility," used primarily by the United States Marine Corps (USMC).

The three runways that were in use when World War II ended still exist. The United States military maintains the western runway as a small unimproved  coral runway. It also has a simulated LHA deck, and a drop zone for parachute training, being part of a military training facility operated by the USMC. There is a detachment of usually less than 20 Marines which operates the range. F-35 operations have been conducted at the USMC facility.  An admin and housing facility for personnel has been built at the Northern end of the derelict middle airstrip.

The eastern runway is now Iejima Airport and is used by a small civilian air carrier, and the central one is now abandoned and is used as a thoroughfare for residents to get from the north to the south side of the island.

The Simulated LHA deck is used by Marine Wing Support Squadron 172 Marine Aircraft Group 36. The coral runway is also still in use for touch and go operations.

The Iejima Light House is located within the U.S. military fence line at the southwest end of the island. The USMC, along with the Japan Coast Guard, periodically hosts a memorial ceremony for the light keeper killed during the battle of Ie Shima in WWII.

See also
Naval Base Okinawa

Notes

References

Maurer, Maurer (1983). Air Force Combat Units Of World War II. Maxwell AFB, Alabama: Office of Air Force History. .
www.pacificwrecks.com
The Battle for Ie Shima 
The True Story of the Japanese Surrender in WW2
A Closer Look at the Japanese Betty Bombers
The 34th Fighter Squadron on Ie Shima
Research the Battle of Okinawa Here
National Archives at College Park, Maryland, microfiche Roll #A0290, slides 0388 to 0532, history of the 1892nd Engineer Aviation Battalion

Airfields of the United States Army Air Forces in Occupied Japan
Japan campaign
Airfields of the United States Marine Corps
1945 establishments in Japan
1946 disestablishments in Japan
Ryukyuan history